Business Professionals of America (BPA) is a career and technical student organization that is headquartered in Columbus, Ohio.

Officers 

Every Business Professionals of America chapter has presiding officers for the national organization, state associations, and local chapters. They all share and carry out similar tasks at all levels.

At the national level, the National Officers are collectively referred to as the "Executive Council.” These elected student members shall operate as a highly functional team, dedicated to the welfare of their respective division and success of all members. They represent the national organization at various conferences and meetings during their term and have the opportunity to make recommendations to the National Board of Trustees.

The Executive Council for the Secondary Division is composed of up to six officer positions, including
 President
 Vice President
 Secretary
 Treasurer
 Historian
 Parliamentarian

The Executive Council for the Post-secondary Division is composed of up to four officer positions, including
 President
 Vice President 
 Secretary/Treasurer
 Parliamentarian

The 2022-2023 National Officers are

Secondary Division:
 D’Schon Simmons (Texas) - President
 Lucy Christensen (Idaho) - Vice President
 Adriel Bustillos (Texas) - Secretary
 Liam Sternfeldt (Indiana) - Treasurer

Post-secondary Division:
 Engen Sundberg (Alaska) - President
 Lisa Kleman (Wisconsin) - Vice President
 Daniyal Ghayasuddin (Texas) - Secretary/Treasurer

Types of awards 

BPA rewards members in three categories:
Competitive Events: Members are rewarded for high placement in competitive events using the Workplace Skills Assessment Program (WSAP), preparing students for success in the business world by developing skills in areas such as finance, IT, and computer applications.
BPA Cares Awards: Members can apply or nominate others for awards in the areas of Service Learning, Special Recognition, and Professional Awards.
Torch Awards: Members are rewarded for excellence in seven categories such as "Patriotism," "Leadership," "Love, Hope, and Faith," "Knowledge," "Cooperation," and "Friendship".

Leadership conferences
There are several levels of competition held at conferences and competition advancement is sought at each level in events referred to in the awards section.

Regional Leadership Conference (RLC) or District Leadership Conference (DLC)
State Leadership Conference (SLC)
National Leadership Conference (NLC)

Many regions, districts, or states opt to also arrange Fall Leadership Conferences in which there is no competition. These conferences are usually less formal than at RLC/DLC, SLC, and NLC instead often focusing on workshops over areas such as social media etiquette, proper professional dress, public speaking, etc.

National Leadership Conference 

Every year BPA hosts a National Leadership Conference (NLC) with nearly 6,000 students from across the nation. At NLC, students compete in over 71 competitive events with students from across the United States. BPA will host the 2023 NLC on April 26-30th in Anaheim, California

Coronavirus' Impact on the 2020 National Leadership Conference 
After careful deliberation and to ensure the health and safety of all members, on March 13, 2020, due to the COVID-19 pandemic, the BPA Board of Trustees made the decision to cancel the 2020 National Leadership Conference. It was scheduled to be held May 6–10 at the Gaylord National Resort & Convention Center located in Washington, DC

Past National Leadership Conference Locations

Future National Leadership Conference Locations

History 
Business Professionals of America was formed in 1966 as the Office Education Association (OEA).

References

External links 

 Business Professionals of America Official Website

Career and technical student organizations